Eartham Pit is an internationally important archaeological site north-east of Boxgrove in West Sussex with findings that date to the Lower Palaeolithic. The oldest human remains in Britain have been discovered on the site, fossils of Homo heidelbergensis dating to 500,000 years ago. Boxgrove is also one of the oldest sites in Europe with direct evidence of hunting and butchering by early humans. Only part of the site is protected through designation, one area being a  geological Site of Special Scientific Interest, as well as a Geological Conservation Review site.

Other key Palaeolithic sites in the UK include Swanscombe, Pontnewydd, Kents Cavern, Paviland, and Gough's Cave.

The site is close to a fossil shoreline that has interglacial mammal fauna in intertidal sediments. The site was discovered by Andrew Woodcock and Roy Shephard-Thorn in 1974. They recorded the geological sequence, in-situ artefacts and fossil mammal remains. Parts of the site complex were later excavated between 1982 and 1996 by a team led by Mark Roberts of the Institute of Archaeology, University College London. The site is situated in an area that features a buried chalk cliff that overlooked a flat beach (which contained a waterhole) stretching approximately half a mile (1 km) south to the sea.

History
The site is important for many reasons, including the degree of preservation of ancient land surfaces, the impressive total extent of the palaeolandscape beyond the quarries (over 26 km wide), its huge quantity of well-preserved animal bones, its numerous flint artifacts, and its hominin fossils that are among some of the most ancient found yet in Europe. Several of the animal bones are the oldest found specimens of their species, such as the wing bone of the great auk found at the site in 1989.  The combination of bones, stone artifacts, and the geology of the landscape gives a very complete picture of the coastal plain as it existed half a million years ago.

Numerous Acheulean flint tools and remains of animals dating to approximately 500,000 years ago were found at the site. Some of the bones were found to display cut marks, and some of the tools bear use wear traces indicative of cutting meat, indicating that the site was used for butchery by some of the earliest occupants of the British Isles.  They shared the area with a wide variety of animals whose bones have been found there, including lion, bear, rhinoceros, and giant deer, as well as numerous smaller animals such as frog, vole, and birds. Comparison with ethnographic and experimental examples of stone-tool-assisted butchery has shown that game animals at Boxgrove were butchered expertly, and it is likely that the variety of animal life in the area attracted human hunters.

Evidence for hunting is, however, tentative, consisting primarily of a horse shoulder blade with a semicircular hole that has been interpreted as the mark of a projectile impact. Given that wooden spears decay very quickly, it is no surprise that no hunting equipment has been found on the site. As well, it is a fact that wooden spears do not generally cause great damage to the bony areas of impact such as the pelvis. Thus, the horse shoulder blade mark is a rare piece of evidence of hunting activity.

Remains of an archaic human provisionally thought to be a member of the Homo heidelbergensis subspecies were first found on the site in 1993, comprising the partial tibia of a human who probably stood 1.8m high and weighed approximately 80 kg. Significantly, this is the only postcranial element of Homo Heidelbergensis to have been found in northern Europe (postcranial indicates bones coming from anywhere other than the skull, considered the top or leading bone of the body). The tibia is extremely robust for its size and may be an indication of high running activity, presumably in tracking an animal after it has been speared. Cold adaptation is another possible reason for the robust quality. Both ends of the bone show signs of gnawing, possibly by a wolf, suggesting that perhaps the Boxgrove hominids were sometimes prey to other animals. In 1995 two incisor teeth from another individual hominid were found. These show evidence of severe periodontal disease and they also show tool cut marks, which are thought to have been caused by use of flint tools near the mouth rather than indicating cannibalism.

In 2003 English Heritage announced it would buy the western quarry (known as Quarry 1) to ensure the preservation of the site complex.

In August 2020 archaeologists said they had discovered the earliest bone tools ever found in Europe at the site. They said that it provides further evidence that early human populations at Boxgrove were cognitively, socially, and culturally sophisticated.

Excavation History

The Boxgrove site was first discovered by the archaeologist Andrew Woodcock and the geologist Roy Shephard-Thorn in 1974. During the first stages of gravel extraction, their investigations showed a series of marine deposits, overlain by gravels, were preserved within the quarry . Woodcock recorded exceptionally well preserved Acheulean artefacts and mammalian fauna at the intersection between these sediments and determined the potential importance of the site.

Between 1982 and 1996 a series of excavations were undertaken at the site by the UCL Institute of Archaeology with funding from Historic England. The excavations were directed by Mark Roberts of the UCL Institute of Archaeology, with successive co-direction by Martin Bates and Simon Parfitt.

In 2011, Roberts told interviewers from the student-produced archaeological magazine Artifact that Boxgrove was "a fickle mistress indeed" and that whilst he wouldn't change his experience in investigating the site, the excavations "extracted a very heavy price" from him, "a price that I am only just at the point of paying the final instalment on". For this reason he found that he often hummed The Specials' 1979 song "Too Much Too Young" to himself when thinking about the project.

Publication
In addition to over twenty scientific papers, the site is published through two monographs:

Boxgrove: A Middle Pleistocene Hominid Site at Eartham Quarry, Boxgrove, West Sussex. Edited by Mark Roberts and Simon Parfitt Boxgrove: A Middle Pleistocene hominid site at Eartham Quarry, Boxgrove, West Sussex is now available through the Archaeology Data Service.

The Horse Butchery Site: A High Resolution Record of Lower Palaeolithic Hominin Behaviour at Boxgrove, UK. Edited by Matthew Pope, Simon Parfitt and Mark Roberts.

In 1998, Roberts co-wrote a book about the site with prehistoric archaeologist Mike Pitts that is entitled Fairweather Eden: Life in Britain half a million years ago as revealed by the excavations at Boxgrove. Published by Arrow Books, Fairweather Eden was designed for a popular audience.

See also
 Gough's Cave
 Genetic history of the British Isles
 Happisburgh
 Kents Cavern
 List of human evolution fossils
 List of prehistoric structures in Great Britain
 Prehistoric Britain
 Paviland
 Pontnewydd
 Swanscombe

References
Footnotes

Bibliography

External links

History of West Sussex
Stone Age sites in England
Archaeological sites in West Sussex
Sites of Special Scientific Interest in West Sussex
Paleoanthropological sites
Paleolithic Europe
Geological Conservation Review sites